Daniel Béland is a Canadian former competitive figure skater. After winning the 1977 World Junior Championships, he was awarded medals at the Ennia Challenge Cup and Prague Skate. His skating club was CPA Palestre Nationale. In 2007, he joined the coaching staff of CPA Saint-Laurent in Saint-Laurent, Quebec.

References

Navigation

Canadian male single skaters
Living people
World Junior Figure Skating Championships medalists
Year of birth missing (living people)